Angelo "Skip" Saviano is a Republican and a former member of the Illinois House of Representatives, representing the 77th district from 1993 to 2012. 
He served on seven committees: Registration and Regulation; Committee of the Whole; Aging; Appropriations-Public Safety; Executive; Public Utilities; and Ex-Offender and Reentry Subcommittee.  He is currently the Village President of Elmwood Park, a large municipality in northwest Cook County.

During the 2008 Republican Party presidential primaries, Saviano served on the Illinois leadership team of the presidential campaign of former New York City Mayor Rudy Giuliani. In 2015, Saviano signed an amicus brief to the United States Supreme Court in favor of same-sex marriage. In the 2016 Republican Party presidential primaries, Saviano was a delegate pledged to the presidential campaign of Jeb Bush.

References

External links
Skip Saviano official website
Illinois General Assembly - Representative Angelo Saviano (R) 77th District official IL House website
Bills Committees
Project Vote Smart
Illinois House Republican Caucus - Angelo Saviano profile

1958 births
Living people
Republican Party members of the Illinois House of Representatives
Mayors of places in Illinois
21st-century American politicians
People from Elmwood Park, Illinois
Politicians from Chicago
DePaul University alumni